Reflector is the debut album by Australian band Killing Heidi, released in 2000 by Roadshow Music. It won the 2000 ARIA Music Award for Best Rock Album.

Album information
The album was an enormous success, propelling the band to prominence and eventually spending seven weeks at No. 1 on the ARIA charts. It eventually went 5× Platinum in Australia (selling over 350,000 copies) and won the ARIA Award for Album of the Year at the ARIA Music Awards of 2000.

Upon its release in early 2000, Reflector became the fastest-selling album in Australian music history. Reflector spawned four hit singles: "Weir" (which peaked at No. 6 on the national charts in 1999), "Mascara" (the band's first No. 1 single), "Live Without It" (No. 5), and "Superman Supergirl" (No. 57)

Track listing

Awards and nominations

Awards
2000 ARIA Awards, Album of the Year for Reflector
2000 ARIA Awards, Best Group for Reflector
2000 ARIA Awards, Breakthrough Artist – Album for Reflector
2000 ARIA Awards, Best Rock Album for Reflector

Nominations
2000 ARIA Awards, Single of the Year for "Mascara" (lost to Madison Avenue's "Don't Call Me Baby")
2000 ARIA Awards, Highest Selling Album for Reflector (lost to Savage Garden's Affirmation)
2000 ARIA Awards, Best Cover Art (by Paul Kosky) for Reflector (lost to Janet English's art for Spiderbait's single "Glokenpop")
2001 ARIA Awards, Best Group for "Superman/Supergirl" (lost to Powderfinger's Odyssey Number Five)
2001 ARIA Awards, Producer of the Year (Paul Kosky) for "Superman/Supergirl" (lost to Bobbydazzler's art for The Avalanches' album Since I Left You)

Charts

Weekly charts

Year-end charts

Certifications

References

2000 debut albums
ARIA Award-winning albums
Killing Heidi albums